San Pedro, officially the City of San Pedro, is a 1st class component city in the province of Laguna, Philippines. According to the 2020 census, it has a population of 326,001 people.

It is named after its patron saint, Saint Peter.

San Pedro has been dubbed as “dormitory town” of Metro Manila and migrants from other provinces commuting everyday through its highly efficient road and transport system. Despite being one of the smallest political units in the entire province, with a total land area of only 24.05 km2, San Pedro is the 5th most populous city (out of 6) after the cities of Calamba, Santa Rosa, Biñan and Cabuyao. The city also has the highest population density in the province of Laguna and in the whole Calabarzon region, having 14,000 people/km2. As a first class municipality, it became a component city of Laguna by virtue of RA 10420 dated March 27, 2013.

History

Early History

The Area of where the modern city of San Pedro is found served as the native settlement of the Tagalogs centuries before Spanish contact. Laguna de Bay and the San Isidro River gave livelihood and food to the early settlers. The Laguna Copperplate Inscription dated back to 900 AD mentioning the ancient polity of Tondo was found on Lumban, Laguna giving the idea that the area of San Pedro which some independent Ancient Barangays headed by their own Datus are settled was under the influence if not directly under the alliance network of the Lakan of Tondo.

On January 16, 1571, it was announced by Miguel López de Legazpi that a settlement called "Tabuko" which is an old Tagalog term that means "the end part of the river" be converted to an encomienda or a town under the helm of Gaspar Ramirez. A month after Miguel López de Legazpi established Manila as the capital of Spanish East Indies, Legazpi's grandson and  conquistador Juan de Salcedo, while exploring the region of Laguna de Bay, founded a settlement in Biñan which was annexed as a barrio to Tabuko, a large town which also then comprised what are now the cities of San Pedro, Santa Rosa, and Cabuyao.

Spanish Period
San Pedro de Tunasán became a town on January 18, 1725, upon the request of San Pedrense Principalía led by Alonzo Magtibay, Francisco Santiago, and Ignacio de Guevarra and approved by the Governor-General and Manila Archbishop Francisco de la Cuesta, King Philip V of Spain decreed that the town formerly known as "Tabuko" be a separate town from "Kabuyaw" (now known as the city of Cabuyao).
Francisco Santiago subsequently became the first mayor of the newly formed town.

By virtue of the last will of Philip V of Spain, Rodriguez de Figueroa or "Don Esteban", a group of Augustinian Fathers gained the ownership of the Tunasán Estate. Later on, San Pedro became an hacienda of Colegio de San José, a group of Jesuits who took over the property which now is known as "San Pedro Tunasán". Tunasán literally means "a place where there is Tunás" (Nymphaea nouchali), a medicinal plant abundant on shoreline area.

During that period, agriculture, fishing, duck raising, fruit trees, and sampaguita were the main source of income of its residents. This period was highlighted by the growing tenant/landlord dispute. The tenants of Hacienda San Pedro Tunasán fought for their birthrights over their ancestral lands. This struggle took almost 423 years of unsuccessful resistance to Colegio de San José, and in 1938, the government bought the home sites of the San Pedro Tunasán Hacienda from the Colegio for re-sale to its tenants. This event laid to rest the tenants/landlord problem in the town.

During the Philippine Revolution, after the execution of Andres Bonifacio and Procopio Bonifacio at Maragondon, Cavite on 1897, the group of Gregoria de Jesus, the wife of Andres, departed to San Pedro Tunasán to hide. They were welcomed by San Pedro native Gregoria Olivares and settled on the house of Almario Ilmedo on barrio San Roque.

American Period 
On November 25, 1903, San Pedro, alongside the then-Municipio of Muntinlupa (then part of Rizal), was included within the municipal boundary of Biñan. A barrio called Tunasancillo became part of the Municipio of Muntinlupa which was a part of the province of Manila when the town of San Pedro Tunasán sold it in 1907 during the American period. On February 28, 1914, the name of the town, San Pedro de Tunasán, was shortened to its present name of San Pedro, by virtue of Philippine Legislature Act No. 2390. From the Spanish time until after the Japanese occupation of the Philippines, the scenario did change a bit.

During World War II, Abelardo Remoquillo (1922-1945), known among his peers, war enemies, and admirers as “Captain Remo”, was a young guerrillero from San Pedro, Laguna who fought against the Japanese Imperial Army. He joined the Hunters ROTC guerilla and fought against the invaders from different fronts of Southern Luzón He also participated in the famous Raid at Los Baños. He died not in San Pedro but in faraway Bay, Laguna while attacking a Japanese garrison.
He is now known as a local hero and has a monument on the historic town plaza of San Pedro.

Contemporary History
On August 30, 1954, President Ramón Magsaysay signed at the historic town plaza the Land Tenancy Act. By virtue of this law, farm lots of the hacienda were bought by the Philippine government to be sold at cost to the tenants or occupants of the farm lots in Bayan-Bayanan under the Narra Settlement Project of the Magsaysay Administration. San Pedro became a resettlement area for families in Metro Manila in 1968 to 1971. Thereon population significantly increased with the rise of several GSIS/SSS housing projects in 1975. Industries sprouted in the succeeding years such as the Aclem Paper Mills, Holiday Hills Golf and Country Club (now KC Filipinas Golf Resort Club), Philippine Tobacco Flu Curing Corporation, Berbacs Chemicals, US Tobacco Corporation, Holland Milk Products, Trinity Lodge Mining Corporation, Kimberly Clark, Cosmos, among others.

The succeeding administration of ex Mayors Felicisimo Vierneza and Calixto Cataquiz brought significant changes in the political, economic and cultural landscape of San Pedro. There were major commercial and industrial developments during the administration of Mayor Vierneza starting 1972 while Mayor Cataquiz's 12- year administration in 1986 focused on residential subdivisions with massive infrastructure projects and beautification programs.

Cityhood

On March 27, 2013, President Benigno Aquino III signed the Republic Act No. 10420 converting the municipality into a new component city of the province of Laguna.  The cityhood of San Pedro was ratified through a plebiscite scheduled by the Commission on Elections (COMELEC). The date for the ratification is December 28, 2013, after the National Barangay Elections. It became the sixth city of Laguna after the cities of Biñan, Cabuyao, Calamba, San Pablo, and Santa Rosa, and also the third to be a city in the 1st congressional District Laguna - making it the first city district in the province.

COMELEC officially proclaimed the first-class municipality of San Pedro as a component city of Laguna on December 29, 2013. Juanito Icarro, regional director of Calabarzon and Mimaropa, and Marianne Marfori, provincial election supervisor, made the proclamation at the municipal hall after San Pedro residents voted for the cityhood in a plebiscite held on December 28, 2013. "Yes" votes for cityhood totaled 16,996 (which is an additional 50 votes added in some precincts mostly in the San Vicente area to win the "yes" vote), and "no" votes, only 869, in 501 clustered precincts in San Pedro. Only 11% of 165,777 registered voters in San Pedro's 27 barangays took part in the plebiscite.

San Pedro eyed as 18th member of Metro Manila
Support groups from the local government and non-government organizations are striving to incorporate San Pedro into Metro Manila.

Former Metro Manila Development Authority (MMDA) Chairman Francis Tolentino is pushing for the inclusion of the city in the National Capital Region, and eventually become its 18th member city. Tolentino said that in the first meeting of the MMDA Council of mayors in January 2015, he will push for the inclusion of the city to the MMDA.

San Pedro as a lone district in Laguna
Senator Aquilino "Koko" Pimentel III sought for the separation of the city of San Pedro from the first legislative district of Laguna province to constitute a lone congressional district. In 2015, Pimentel filed Senate Bill No. 3029 for the creation of the San Pedro as a separate district to commence in the next national and local elections.

After the city of Santa Rosa formally had its own legislative district, San Pedro remained as the only city in the First District; hence, the 1st District may be also referred as the Lone district of San Pedro and in 2022, San Pedro elected its first very own Representative for the 19th Congress and two more city councilors.

Geography
San Pedro is located in Region IV-A or Calabarzon. San Pedro is the boundary between Laguna and Metro Manila, so San Pedro is known as "Laguna's Gateway to Metro Manila". San Pedro shares boundaries with Metro Manila's southernmost city, Muntinlupa (North) bounded with Tunasan River, Biñan (South), Dasmariñas (West), Carmona and General Mariano Alvarez (Southwest) bound with San Isidro River. Its position makes San Pedro a popular suburban residential community, where many residents commute daily to Metro Manila for work.

Barangays

San Pedro is politically subdivided into 27 barangays.

 Bagong Silang
 Calendola
 Chrysanthemum
 Cuyab
 Estrella
 Fatima
 G.S.I.S.
 Landayan
 Langgam
 Laram
 Maharlika
 Magsaysay
 Narra
 Nueva
 Pacita 1
 Pacita 2
 Poblacion
 Riverside
 Rosario
 Sampaguita Village
 San Antonio
 San Roque
 San Vicente
 San Lorenzo Ruiz
 Santo Niño
 United Bayanihan
 United Better Living

Notes

Climate

Demographics

The City of San Pedro is the 37th most populous city in the Philippines. As of 2020, the population is 326,001, up from 294,310 in 2010, or an increase of almost 11%.

Religion

San Pedro is home for the famous Krus ng San Pedro Tunasán. Majority of the people are Roman Catholics. Other religious groups include are the Members Church of God International (MCGI), Jesus Miracle Crusade International Ministry (JMCIM), United Church of Christ in the Philippines (UCCP), Jesus Is Lord Church (JIL), Jesus Christ the Lifegiver Ministries (JCLM), Iglesia Ni Cristo (INC), The United Methodist Church, Presbyterian Churches, Christian Bible Baptist Church, other Baptist and Bible Fundamental churches. Islam is also practiced within the community. There are 15 Catholic parishes in the city, and one mosque.

Economy 

Most economic activity in San Pedro is concentrated at San Antonio, also the city's largest and most populous barangay. Barangay Nueva, the city center, is home to a central public market (palengke) as well as clothing and homeware stores, and some supermarkets. San Pedro also has a large number of factories, most notably the Alaska Milk Corporation factory in San Antonio.

Agriculture
Agricultural lands now account for only  of the total land area due to residential, commercial and industrial conversions. There are lands with slope ranging from 8%-15% of the total land area located in parts of barangays San Antonio and San Vicente planted with mangoes and siniguelas trees. Livestock and poultry businesses operate in the area.

Commerce and industry
There are 4,705 total business establishments, 40+ commercial, savings and rural banks, 110+ restaurant, cafeteria, and other refreshment parlor, and two public and five private markets and supermarkets. There are 40 banks, over 60 pawnshops, over 30 lending institutions and 11 insurance companies operating in the city. Commercial and business establishments are mostly concentrated at Pacita Complex and Rosario. A large percentage of industrial and manufacturing establishments of San Pedro is located on the adjacent barangays of San Vicente and San Antonio; E&E Industrial Complex is located in San Antonio where some of the city's factories are situated.

Malls
Robinsons Galleria South, San Pedro's first major mall located at Barangay Nueva, opened on July 19, 2019. Galleria South is the 1st Robinsons Galleria mall in South Luzon and 3rd nationwide. The mall houses government offices like Philhealth, Pag-ibig, LTO, etc., and also has art pieces at every corner.It has to rise new SM Supermalls in the future.

Tourism

Sampaguita Festival
The annual City Festival is celebrated in the second week of February. This week-long festival includes various activities ranging from cultural to sports, trade fairs, amateur singing contests, parades, historical exhibits, social and religious gatherings, tribal dances, street dances, cheering and sport exhibitions.  The highlight of the festival is the coronation night of the "Hiyas ng San Pedro". The festival aims to promote tourism in San Pedro and to revitalize Sampaguita industry in the community. The celebration was formerly known as "Manok ni San Pedro Festival", which started in 1999 and was renamed to "Sampaguita Festival" in 2002. The celebration kicked off with a grand parade.

San Pedro City holds the record of laying the longest sampaguita (flower lei) line, spanning , from Biñan–San Pedro City boundary to San Pedro City - Muntinlupa boundary on the National Highway; this was listed in the Guinness World Records in 2009.

Christmas Festival
Paskuhan Sa San Pedro is an annually celebrated festival in San Pedro City. It starts at the beginning of December and runs to the end of the month. The opening is a grand parade which is participated in by public and private schools in the city, local government and other socio-civic organizations. The main event of the opening is the lighting of the whole plaza, fireworks display, and various school performances. Every night a variety of shows are performed by the participants, which last up to midnight. On December 29 of every year the cityhood anniversary of San Pedro is celebrated.

Salvador Laurel Museum and Library

The museum preserves and celebrates the insurmountable 
professional and Political avchievement of the late statesman, located at Holliday hills.

Transportation

San Pedro is traversed by the South Luzon Expressway, which roughly cuts through the middle of town, and the older National Highway (Route 1), an at-grade route mostly used by public transportation.

San Pedro is at the terminus of numerous city bus routes, and the central bus terminal is at Pacita Complex. Jeepneys ply the highway, and there are also jeepneys that connects the barangays to the west. Most of the city is served by tricycles, while barangay Landayan and some subdivisions (gated communities) have pedicabs as well.

The PNR Metro Commuter Line serves the city, with two stations: San Pedro (at barangay San Vicente) and Pacita Main Gate (at Nueva).

Healthcare
Throughout the city, healthcare is primarily provided at the Barangay Health Centers in every barangay. Also, several medical missions are operated and provided by local and international organizations. The major hospitals in the city are:

 Jose L. Amante Emergency Hospital (Barangay Santo Niño)
 Gavino Alvarez Lying-In Center (Barangay Narra)
 San Pedro Doctors Hospital (Manila South Road-Landayan)
 Divine Mercy Hospital (Guevara Subd.)
 Westlake Medical Center (Manila South Road-Pacita Complex)
 Evangelista Medical Specialty Hospital (Macaria Ave.-Pacita Complex)
 Family Care Hospital (Macaria Ave.-Pacita Complex)

Housing
Most people in San Pedro live in over 59 subdivisions, that are either gated communities or open residential areas. The city is also a location of several government-led relocation projects. Squatters, or informal settlers, are scattered over the city.

Education

The Department of Education Region IV-A - Division of San Pedro supervises the operation of over 12 public elementary schools and 7 public high schools and provides permits to over 35 private schools, including Catholic schools. Private schools are scattered throughout the city, especially on the subdivisions. With the implementation of the K-12 program, some private schools added senior high schools, and many public high schools still have limited facilities for senior high schools.
 
Tertiary education and technical education are provided by several institutions scattered across the city. Saint Louis Anne Colleges has three campuses. The campus on the Old National Highway is for college students. The campus in Elvinda Village is for Pre School, Elementary High School and TESDA Courses. The Saint Louis Anne Annex campus near Harmony Mall is for students living at UB, Sampaguita, Langgam etc. The Laguna Northwestern College has two campuses in San Pedro, one being a branch in Pacita Complex and the other one at A. Mabini Street. Polytechnic University of the Philippines has one campus in the city. San Pedro College of Business Administration in Barangay Nueva provides courses related to business administration. San Pedro City Polytechnic College, located at Barangay Narra, opened in 2017.

San Pedro Relocation Center National High School is a campus for high school to senior high school students. The Pacita Complex National High School has a STEM-Program as well as the Basic Education Curriculum.

List of schools

 Sampaguita Village National High School, Calendola
 Maranatha Christian Academy, Landayan
 Pacita Complex National High School, Pacita 1
 Pacita Complex Senior High School, Pacita 1
 Immaculate Heart of Mary School, Pacita 2

Government

City Council

List of former chief executives
Municipal mayors:
 Francisco Santiago (1725)
 Turibio Almieda (1901-1902)
 Jose Guevarra (1908-1910)
 Apolonio Morando (1910-1912)
 Jose H. Guevarra (1921-1922)
 Tiburcio Morando (1916-1921; 1922-1925)
 Victor Vergara (1925-1926)
 Jose Martinez (1928-1934)
 Ciriaco M. Limpiahoy (1934–1942)
 Antonio Partoza (1945)
 Benedictio Austria
 Gavino Y. Alvarez
 Mario M. Brigola (1960-1963)
 Jose L. Amante (1941; 1946-1947)
 Felicisimo "Fely" Almendrala Vierneza (1972–1986; 1998–2007)
 Ernesto Climaco (1988)
 Calixto Cataquiz (1986–1988, 1988–1998; 2007–June 24, 2013)
 Norvic D. Solidum (June 24–30, 2013)
 Lourdes S. Catáquiz (June 30–December 28, 2013)
City mayors:
 Lourdes S. Catáquiz (December 28, 2013 – June 30, 2022)
 Art Joseph Francis Mercado (June 30, 2022 – present)

Notable personalities

Entertainment 
 Cacai Bautista, comedian
 Julia Clarete, TV host, actress
 John Lloyd Cruz, actor, model
 Jane De Leon, actress
 Ogie Diaz, comedian, columnist and TV host
 Paw Diaz, actress
 Marlann Flores, actress
 Kristine Hermosa, actress
 Jan Manual, actor
 Rocco Nacino, actor
 Jamilla Obispo, actress
 Gladys Reyes, actress
 Christopher Roxas, actor
 Nathalie Hart, actress
 Nikki Valdez, actress
Jake Zyrus, singer, songwriter

Music 
Rico Blanco, singer, former vocalist of Rivermaya

Pageants 
 Stephanie Retuya, contestant and runner-up in Asia's Next Top Model (cycle 1)
 Desiree Verdadero, Miss Universe 1984 3rd runner-up

Politics 
Salvador Laurel, 8th Vice President of the Philippines (under Corazon C. Aquino), 5th Prime Minister of the Philippines

Journalism and Broadcasting 
Tony Calvento, print/broadcast journalist for The Calvento Files

Sports 
Jema Galanza, PVL MVP, UAAP Beach Volleyball champion for Adamson University Lady Falcons
Chris Javier, basketball player
Kyla Atienza, volleyball player

References

External links

 [ Philippine Standard Geographic Code]
 Philippine Census Information
 Local Governance Performance Management System

 
Cities in Laguna (province)
Populated places established in 1725
1725 establishments in the Philippines
Populated places on Laguna de Bay
Component cities in the Philippines